Pont du Fahs  Airfield is an abandoned military airfield in Tunisia, which was located approximately 6 km west-southwest of El Fahs, and 55 km southwest of Tunis.

A Luftwaffe-held airfield prior to the Operation Torch landings, it was the home of the  5.(Pz.)/Schlachtgeschwader 1, flying Henschel Hs 129 ground attack aircraft.  It was captured by British parachute infantry forces on 29 November 1942.   Once in Allied hands, it was used by B-17 Flying Fortress heavy bombers of the United States Army Air Force XII Bomber Command 97th Bombardment Group.

The 97th moved out in mid August 1943 and after that the airfield was largely abandoned.   Today some evidence of the airfield remains with the main runway being visible in aerial photography and traces of taxiways and disbursement hardstands.

See also
 Boeing B-17 Flying Fortress airfields in the Mediterranean Theater of Operations
 El Fahs
 Pont du Fahs Airfield is the seventh mission in Sniper Elite III

References

 Maurer, Maurer. Air Force Combat Units of World War II. Maxwell AFB, Alabama: Office of Air Force History, 1983. .

External links

Airfields of the United States Army Air Forces in Tunisia
Airfields of the Fifteenth Air Force during World War II